Wang Dao (276 – 7 September 339), courtesy name Maohong (茂弘), formally Duke Wenxian of Shixing (始興文獻公), was a Chinese politician during the Jin dynasty who played an important role in the administrations of Emperor Yuan, Emperor Ming, and Emperor Cheng, including as Emperor Cheng's regent. In these capacities, he served as a crucial governing figure of the Eastern Jin Dynasty during its first decades, as well as the leading member of the prominent Wang clan of Langya. His governance style was to be lenient with the laws, and he handed out few punishments—which stabilized the Jin regime greatly, but which also led to extensive, if moderate, corruption and incompetence in the Jin regime, making it difficult for Jin armies to recapture northern China.

Wang's line, during the subsequent Southern Dynasties, was known as one of the two most honored lines of nobles—the other being Xie An's line—and in the people's minds no less honored than imperial households.

Early career 
Wang Dao's grandfather Wang Lan (王覽) and father Wang Cai (王裁) were mid-level Jin Dynasty officials, and he inherited from them the title Viscount of Jiqiu. He was the grandnephew of Wang Xiang. When he was young, during the late reign of Emperor Hui, he served on the staff of Sima Yue the Prince of Donghai.  During that time, he befriended Sima Rui the Prince of Langye.  It was at Wang's suggestion that Sima Rui slipped out of the capital Luoyang and stayed safe during most of the War of the Eight Princes in his Principality of Langye. When Sima Yue later became regent for Emperor Huai and commissioned Sima Rui to be the military commander for the area southeast of the Yangtze River, posted to Jianye (建業, modern Nanjing, Jiangsu), Wang volunteered to serve on Sima Rui's staff, and he became Sima Rui's chief advisor.

As Sima Rui lacked fame, after he arrived in Jianye, few of the powerful local gentlemen would come visit and support him.  Under Wang Dao's counsel, Sima Rui personally visited He Xun (賀循) and Gu Rong (顧榮) and invited them to serve in his administration.  He and Gu were well regarded by the local population, which eventually began to trust Sima Rui's leadership.  Wang Dao and his cousin, the general Wang Dun, served in key roles, and it was said at the time that the domain was ruled equally by the Simas and the Wangs.  Around the time that Luoyang fell to Han Zhao and Emperor Huai was captured (311), large numbers of refugees fled to Sima Rui's domain.  Wang assisted Sima Rui in settling the refugees and strengthening his rule.  After Emperor Min was also captured by Han Zhao, Wang was one of the officials who urged Sima Rui to take the throne, and he did, initially claiming the title "Prince of Jin" in 317 and then emperor in 318 after Emperor Min was executed by Han Zhao.

During Emperor Yuan's reign 
Initially, Wang Dao continued to serve as chief advisor for Emperor Yuan, but after Emperor Yuan began to have a falling out with Wang Dao's powerful cousin Wang Dun over Wang Dun's domination of the western provinces, he also began to distance himself from Wang Dao.  When Wang Dun finally rebelled in 322 and attacked the capital Jiankang (renamed from Jianye because of naming taboo of Emperor Min's name), Wang Dao feared that his clan would be slaughtered, and he and his clan members went to the palace door to beg for their lives.  Initially, Emperor Yuan would not see them.  When Wang Dao asked Zhou Yi (周顗), an official who had once compared him to Guan Zhong, to intercede on his behalf, Zhou did and persuaded Emperor Yuan that Wang Dao was not involved in Wang Dun's rebellion—but in order to not make Wang Dao grateful for him, he chose not to respond to Wang Dao but instead cursed Wang Dun when Wang Dao begged him, causing Wang Dao to believe that he, like Liu Huai (劉隗) and Diao Xie (刁協), wanted to exterminate the Wang clan. Wang Dao did not find out what Zhou had done for him. Later, after Wang Dun successfully captured Jiankang, forcing Emperor Yuan to submit to him, he asked Wang Dao what he thought of Zhou, and Wang Dao said nothing—so Wang Dun executed Zhou. Later, when Wang found out from imperial archives the petitions that Zhou had submitted on his behalf, he mourned and gave a famous quote, which later became a Chinese idiom:

Although I did not kill Boren(伯仁), Boren died because of me!

Wang Dao continued to serve Emperor Yuan faithfully until Emperor Yuan's death in 323.

During Emperor Ming's reign 
Emperor Yuan was succeeded by his son and crown prince Sima Shao (Emperor Ming), who trusted Wang Dao's faithfulness and made him his prime minister.  Later, when Emperor Ming faced Wang Dun's forces in 324, Wang Dao contributed greatly to defeating Wang Dun's force by falsely claiming that Wang Dun was dead—a claim that the army believed because he was Wang Dun's cousin and which gave the army high morale.  Before Emperor Ming's death in 325, he made Wang Dao one of the officials he entrusted his four-year-old son Sima Yan with.

During Emperor Cheng's reign 
After Sima Yan took the throne (as Emperor Cheng), several officials who were named in Emperor Ming's will were put in charge—that included Wang Dao, Sima Yang (司馬羕) the Prince of Xiyang, Bian Kun (卞壼), Chi Jian, Yu Liang, Lu Ye (陸瞱), and Wen Jiao.  However, quickly, Yu Liang, as the brother of Emperor Cheng's mother Empress Dowager Yu, became effectively the most powerful among them, as Empress Dowager Yu became regent.  Wang's role in government continued to be important, however.

In 327, the ambitious general Su Jun, offended by Yu Liang's attempt to strip him of his military command, rebelled along with Zu Yue, and Su's forces quickly captured Jiankang in early 328, taking Empress Dowager Yu and Emperor Cheng hostage and forcing Yu to flee.  Wang, who remained in Jiankang, continued to be respected by Su, but secretly ordered the provincial forces to resist Su.  As Tao Kan and Wen gathered their forces and marched against Su's, Wang persuaded Su's general Lu Yong (路永) to defect to Tao and Wen, and Wang and Lu fled Jiankang together, joining Tao and Wen's forces.  Later that year, Su was killed in battle, and in early 329, his remaining forces were defeated.  As Empress Dowager Yu died during Su's rebellion, most officials requested Wen stay in Jiankang to serve as regent, but Wen, believing that Emperor Ming intended for Wang to be regent, declined and gave the post to Wang.

For the next few years, Wang was largely in control of the government, but Yu Liang, who had then exiled himself from the capital as the governor of Jing Province (荊州, modern Hubei and Hunan), continued to be influential despite his distance from the capital.  In 338, Yu, unhappy that, in his view, Wang was not adequately preparing Emperor Cheng to rule, tried to persuade Chi Jian to jointly act with him to depose Wang, but Chi refused.  Wang stayed regent until his death in 339, and he was buried with great honors, including some ceremonies that were ordinarily reserved for emperors.  He was succeeded by his assistant He Chong (何充) and Yu Liang's younger brother Yu Bing (庾冰).

References 

 Book of Jin, vol. 65.
 Zizhi Tongjian, vols. 85, 86, 87, 89, 90, 91, 92, 93, 94, 95, 96.

276 births
339 deaths
Jin dynasty (266–420) politicians
Jin dynasty (266–420) regents